Tyrant is a species of  fictional creatures in Resident Evil (Biohazard in Japan), a survival horror video game series created by Japanese company Capcom. It was first introduced in the original Resident Evil (1996).

Since their debut, the Tyrant series became one of the most recognizable and popular monsters and serve as antagonists of the franchise. Two particularly notable Tyrants are Nemesis, the titular antagonist of the video game Resident Evil 3: Nemesis (1999), and Mr. X from the remake of  Resident Evil 2 (2019).

Character design
Capcom artists went through a trial-and-error process designing the Tyrant creatures and their transformations. For example, the T-103 was originally envisioned as armed with firearms; in some sketches, it can be seen wearing a respirator and various armored outfits instead of a trenchcoat (there were also other types of coats, including a lab coat), and even its overall physical build has varied greatly (from very slim to extremely muscular). The only consistent attribute of most Tyrant creature variations seems to be their large, exposed beating hearts which usually serve as their only vulnerable area. In Resident Evil 2 remake, according to director Kazunori Kadoi, the T-103 was created as an indestructible creature that stalks Leon Kennedy and Claire Redfield throughout much of the game. Resident Evil 2 director didn't expect that the T-103 would be popular after the game has been released. Kazunori Kadoi divided the mechanics while building out the T-103 for Resident Evil 2 remake, which it includes the re-working of the AI from the original release. Although others, including GameRevolution has claimed that there are multiple T-103s in the game when it appears everywhere, Capcom confirmed there could be only one.

Appearances

In video games
The game series features many types of Tyrants as the result of several different experiments. Following the discovery of the Progenitor virus, the Umbrella Corporation’s founders become eager to create a Bio-Organic Weapon (B.O.W) that is both powerful and capable of following orders. Prior to the events of Resident Evil Zero, Umbrella used the Progenitor virus to create the Tyrant virus (T-virus), which they believe can be used to manufacture powerful organisms. A problem with the virus’ compatibility with humans set the project back, as only humans with a very rare genetic makeup are capable of mutating into potent and manageable life forms; only one in a million people are estimated to be compatible. Umbrella eventually overcame this setback by resorting to using clones of Sergei Vladimir. 

The events of Resident Evil Zero and Resident Evil chronicle the Umbrella Corporation's development of the Tyrant prototypes, the T-001  (the Proto-Tyrant) and T-002. Though the early Tyrants are defeated in their first encounters, Umbrella manages to use the battle data from those defeats to produce other, more efficient Tyrants in the later installments of Resident Evil. Numerous Tyrants have been created throughout the game series' storyline, such as Tyrant T-078 and the mass-produced Bandersnatches from Resident Evil – Code: Veronica, Hypnos from Resident Evil Survivor, Thanatos from Resident Evil Outbreak and Tyrant R from Resident Evil Outbreak: File 2 each with its own defining characteristics. A revamped version of Tyrant also existed in Resident Evil 5 during the game's development, but not in the finished product. 

Tyrants have been consistently depicted as grotesque and brutally violent creatures, but their intelligence has varied. The first two Tyrants in Resident Evil Zero and Resident Evil are depicted as unintelligent, while the T-103 models such as the T-00 (more popularly known as "Mr. X" and sometimes also as "Trenchcoat") in Resident Evil 2 and the titular Nemesis T-Type in Resident Evil 3: Nemesis are shown to possess limited intelligence and the ability to carry out specific instructions. Both Nemesis-T Type and the T-103 series (two more T-103 Tyrants, code-named Ivan, appear in Resident Evil: The Umbrella Chronicles) are prone to uncontrolled mutation when damaged. Alexia Ashford in Code Veronica retains her full intelligence after being exposed to the T-Veronica virus and gains psychic abilities, including pyrokinesis; similarly, the T+G virus mutated Morpheus D. Duvall in Resident Evil: Dead Aim (Tyrant T-092) gains  bio-electric abilities. The weapons used by Tyrants have also varied; while most Tyrants in the Resident Evil series rely on sheer physical force to subdue opponents, Nemesis, retaining some intelligence due to the Nemesis parasite, is able to use a shoulder-fired hand-held rocket launcher (and a minigun in Resident Evil: Operation Raccoon City) and T-ALOS (Tyrant-Armored Lethal Organic System) in The Umbrella Chronicles is equipped with a shoulder-mounted multiple rocket launcher. He also appears on Resident Evil: Resistance.

Outside of the Resident Evil franchise, there is a Tyrant card in the NDS version of SNK vs. Capcom: Card Fighters Clash. In Marvel vs. Capcom 2: New Age of Heroes, Jill Valentine has a special move that calls forth a Tyrant. A prototype Tyrant appears in the background of the Tricell Laboratory stage in Marvel vs. Capcom 3: Fate of Two Worlds; Tyrant was considered for addition as a playable character, but was rejected over concerns about the game's ESRB rating. The Nemesis T-Type was later added as a playable character in Ultimate Marvel vs. Capcom 3. It appeared in Monster Hunter: World, along with Leon. It also appeared in PUBG Mobile .

In other media
The Tyrant Fossil appears only in the novel Resident Evil: Underworld. In the third Resident Evil live-action film, Resident Evil: Extinction (and its novelization), Umbrella's researcher Dr. Alexander Isaacs tries to subdue his mutation with an antivirus after being bitten by an enhanced zombie. He is shot for insubordination by an executive, Alexander Slater, and is immediately reanimated as a Tyrant. Compared to most of the Tyrants from the games, Isaacs retains his mental faculties and personality even after his mutation. A new version of Tyrant resembling the T-078 with the power limiter appears in the CG film Resident Evil: Damnation.

In merchandise
Several Tyrant action figures were released by various manufacturers, including these by Toy Biz in 1998 (T-002 and T-103),  Moby Dick Toys in 2001 (four T-103 Tyrants), Palisades Toys in 2001 (T-103) and 2002 (T-002), and NECA in 2007 (T-002). A 1:6 scale (35 cm) resin figure of T-002 in Umbrella Chronicles was also released by Gaya Entertainment and a PVC statuette was released by Organic, both in 2008. Since 2011, various Tyrant "infected" cards were featured in Bandai's Resident Evil Deck Building Game. In 2012, Resident Evil theme restaurant Biohazard Cafe & Grill S.T.A.R.S. in Tokyo was furnished with one-to-one scale Tyrant prop made by the special effects studio creating costumes for Toei Company's tokusatsu heroes; the exposition is a central part of the restaurant.

Reception
In 2009, IGN featured the Tyrants in the lists of the best Resident Evil bosses and the series' best villains (readers' choice). That same year, the Tyrant was included among the 12 characters and creatures that the staff of IGN would like see to return in Resident Evil 6, commenting that "almost as much a hallmark of the RE franchise as the zombie, the Tyrant is a recurring favorite." IGN added: "Resident Evil is supposed to be a terrifying experience, and much of the terror stems from pitting players against foes who completely outmatch them. That's the Tyrant in a nutshell." IGN also included an "any type of Tyrant" in their dream roster for Marvel vs. Capcom 3. In 2012, PlayStation Official Magazine ranked Tyrant as the seventh top Resident Evil monster (in addition to Nemesis placing fifth). That same year, IGN ranked the T-002 as the best boss in the series, adding that "even 15 years later, Resident Evil games continue to use this formula (and its finish) as a blueprint for bosses."  IGN staff also named Nemesis as one of the best Resident Evil bosses of all time. In 2000, GameSpot collectively ranked the Tyrants as the tenth best villain in video games. In 2013, Complex ranked the original Tyrant as the 13th greatest soldier in video games, the encounter with it as the 25th best boss battle of all time, and the second Tyrant fight in Code: Veronica as the 46th hardest boss battle in video game history. Some publications also singled out the Tyrant T-103 model (Mr. X) for a special acclaim. In 2010, PSU included the scene of Mr. X suddenly busting through a brick wall in Resident Evil 2 on the list of ten "pant-wetting PlayStation moments". PSU.com also featured Mr. X, along with the T-002 and Nemesis, on their 2011 list of the "seven badass bosses" in the 15 years of Resident Evil. That same year, Empire ranked it as the 39th greatest video game character overall, adding that "Nemesis never quite captured the silent dread of Mr. X." IGN named Mr. X as one of the best video game character of 2019. Jordan Devore of Destructoid has claimed that Mr. X freaked him out by stating that "He’s stoic and calculated in a way that’s somehow even scarier." Dustin Bailey of PCGamesN described that Lady Dimitrescu looks like an upgraded version of Mr. X from Resident Evil Village, while Alex Donaldson of VG247 called Mr. X as "the perfect panic-inducing enemy." Red Bull called Mr. X as one of the scariest video game villains of all time, because "The beast is an absolute force of nature, and the Resident Evil games were elevated as a direct result of his presence."

References 

Capcom antagonists
Cyborg characters in video games
Fictional hybrid life forms
Fictional mute characters
Fictional super soldiers
Fictional mass murderers
Fictional monsters
Genetically engineered characters in video games
Horror film villains
Mutant characters in video games
Resident Evil characters
Science fiction film characters
Video game bosses
Video game characters introduced in 1996
Video game characters with accelerated healing
Video game characters with electric or magnetic abilities
Video game characters with superhuman strength
Science fiction weapons